XHIS-FM is a radio station on 106.3 FM in Ciudad Guzmán, Jalisco. It is known as La Rancherita and is operated by Grupo Radiofónico ZER. The station is simulcast on ZER-owned XHPTAM-FM 88.9 in Tamazula de Gordiano, which was won in the IFT-4 radio station auction of 2017.

History
XEIS-AM 670 received its concession on December 9, 1963 and signed on June 25, 1965. The 1 kW daytimer was sold to Radio Sistema del Pacífico by the end of the 1960s.

It was authorized to move to FM in 2011, and in 2018, the transmitter was moved to Cerro La Escalera.

In 2016, ownership of Radio Sistema del Pacífico, which had been held by Guadalajara-based Unidifusión, was transferred entirely to Rodrigo Rodríguez Reyes and Josefina Reyes Sahagún, marking the definitive acquisition of XHIS-FM by Grupo Radiofónico ZER.

References

Radio stations in Jalisco